"This One's for Rock'n'Roll" is single by the Finnish rock band Hanoi Rocks, first released as downloadable song. The song rose to the top 10 most-downloaded songs in Finland on 16 August 2007 and spent a week in the top 10.

Personnel 
Michael Monroe – lead vocals, saxophone
Andy McCoy – lead guitar
Conny Bloom – rhythm guitar
Andy Christell – bass
Lacu – drums

Hanoi Rocks songs
2007 songs
Songs written by Andy McCoy
Songs written by Michael Monroe